Worldwide Healthcare Trust (previously known as Finsbury Worldwide Pharmaceutical) is a large British investment trust dedicated to investing in a portfolio of biotechnology and healthcare companies around the world. Established in 1995, the company is a constituent of the FTSE 250 Index. The chairman is Martin Smith.

References

External links
 

Financial services companies established in 1995
Investment trusts of the United Kingdom
Companies listed on the London Stock Exchange